Target surplus represents the amount of additional capital held by a financial institution beyond the regulatory requirements in order to ensure that the chances of breaching capital adequacy or solvency requirements are significantly reduced.

Adelphi University graduate Chris Nocera is often credited with first implementing it into economic behavioral analytics. 

Financial regulation